To the Lake, is a Russian post-apocalyptic thriller television series launched on the Premier platform on 14 November 2019. The first season of the show is based on Vongozero, a novel by Russian author Yana Vagner. Netflix acquired the series and released it internationally on 8 October 2020.

Synopsis
Residents of Moscow are infected with an unknown deadly virus, the main symptoms of which are coughing and discoloration of the eyes; after three to four days, death occurs. As the disease becomes an epidemic, the Russian capital gradually turns into a city of the dead: there is no electricity, money has lost its value, chaos and lawlessness reign everywhere, and gangs of marauders gather. The media are panicking, and those who are not yet infected are desperately fighting for food and fuel. The city is quarantined, with all access points closed.

Fleeing from the epidemic, Sergey, along with his new lover, her autistic son, his own son, his ex-wife, his father, and a neighboring family, go to Karelia. There, on a small deserted island in the middle of Vongozero, they plan to hide from the threat of infection in a refuge ship that has been converted into a camping cabin.

Against the background of a terrible global catastrophe, a cruel family drama is also played out. People who normally would never have been under the same roof must now unite to try to escape a deadly disease. On the way, they will not only face various dangers, but also overcome family troubles, learn to survive, and try to forgive.

Cast and characters
 Kirill Käro as Sergey
 Viktoriya Isakova as Anna, Sergey's new wife
 Aleksandr Robak as Lyonya, Sergey's neighbor
 Natalya Zemtsova as Marina, Lyonya's partner
 Maryana Spivak as Irina, Sergey's ex-wife
 Yuri Kuznetsov as Boris Mikhailovich, Sergey's father
 Eldar Kalimulin as Misha, Anna's son, who has autism spectrum disorder
 Viktoriya Agalakova as Polina, Lyonya's daughter
 Saveliy Kudryashov as Anton, Sergey's and Irina's son
 Aleksandr Yatsenko as Pavel

Production

First season
Filming took place in 2018 in the Moscow Oblast and the Arkhangelsk Oblast (in Onega and the village of Malozhma, Onezhsky District). Lake Vongozero was represented by Onega Bay. After its release in Russia, Netflix bought the rights to the series for $1.5 million, according to Kommersant.

Second season
Directed by Dmitry Tyurin, filming for the second season began in April 2021. In October 2020, the producer of the series, Yevgeny Nikishov, announced that the plot would not be based on Living People, the sequel to Vongozero. Filming completed in early September 2021. The first episode was released on 21 April 2022, by Premier.

Episodes

References

External links
 To the Lake on Netflix
 

Russian-language Netflix original programming
Television series about viral outbreaks
2019 Russian television series debuts
Television shows set in Russia
Television shows set in Moscow
Films based on Russian novels